Thorndale may refer to:

Australia 
 Thorndale, Queensland, a locality in the Southern Downs Region

Canada 
 Thorndale, Ontario

United States 
 Thorndale, Pennsylvania
 Thorndale, Texas
 Thorndale station (CTA), rapid transit station in Chicago
 Thorndale station (SEPTA), commuter rail station in Thorndale, Pennsylvania
 Thorndale (Oxford, North Carolina), a historic plantation house